</noinclude>
Ayoub Anis Helassa (born August 27, 2003) is an Algerian karateka. He won the gold medal in the men's kumite 60kg event at the 2022 World Games held in Birmingham, United States. He won one of the bronze medals in the men's 60kg event at the 2021 Islamic Solidarity Games held in Konya, Turkey.

In November 2021, he was eliminated in his first match in the men's 67kg event at the World Karate Championships held in Dubai, United Arab Emirates. In December 2021, he won the silver medal in the men's team kumite event at the African Karate Championships held in Cairo, Egypt.

Achievements

References

External links 
 

Living people
2003 births
Place of birth missing (living people)
Algerian male karateka
Competitors at the 2022 World Games
World Games medalists in karate
World Games gold medalists
Islamic Solidarity Games medalists in karate
Islamic Solidarity Games competitors for Algeria
21st-century Algerian people